Milan Pažout (born 8 June 1948) is a Slovak alpine skier. He competed in three events at the 1968 Winter Olympics.

References

1948 births
Living people
Slovak male alpine skiers
Olympic alpine skiers of Czechoslovakia
Alpine skiers at the 1968 Winter Olympics
People from Krompachy
Sportspeople from the Košice Region
Universiade silver medalists for the Czech Republic
Universiade medalists in alpine skiing
Competitors at the 1968 Winter Universiade